The 2021–22 Wisconsin Badgers men's basketball team represented the University of Wisconsin–Madison in the 2021–22 NCAA Division I men's basketball season. The Badgers were led by seventh-year head coach Greg Gard and played their home games at the Kohl Center in Madison, Wisconsin as members of the Big Ten Conference. They finished the season 25–8, 15–5 in Big Ten play to earn a share of the regular season championship. As the No. 2 seed in the Big Ten tournament, they lost Michigan State in the quarterfinals. They received an at-large bid to the NCAA tournament as the No. 3 seed in the Midwest region, the school's 26th trip to the tournament. They defeated Colgate in the First Round before being upset by No. 11 seed Iowa State in the Second Round.

Previous season
In a season limited due to the ongoing COVID-19 pandemic, the Badgers finished the 2020–21 season 18–13, 10–10 in Big Ten play to finish tied for sixth place. They defeated Penn State in the second round of the Big Ten tournament, but lost to Iowa in the quarterfinals. They received an at-large bid to the NCAA tournament, their 25th trip to the NCAA Tournament, as the No. 9 seed in the South region. The Badgers defeated North Carolina in the First Round before losing to eventual National champion Baylor in the Second Round.

Offseason

Departures
All players listed as "graduated" are tentative departures unless otherwise noted. Due to COVID-19, the NCAA ruled that the 2020–21 season would not count against the college eligibility of any basketball player. Every senior in the 2020–21 season has the option to return for 2021–22.

Incoming transfers

2021 recruiting class

Returning players
On April 14, 2021 Brad Davison announced via Instagram that he is returning for the 2021–22 season his final year of eligibility. In the post he would say "After taking some time to reflect, there is no place I would rather be than Madison! Being a Badger is a privilege. I am grateful for one last ride with my coaches and teammates this upcoming season! I would not want to go out any other way than playing in front of Badger Nation at the Kohl Center!". He is the only senior of seven from the 2020–21 season that decided to return to Wisconsin to use his last year of eligibility.

Roster

Schedule and results

|-
!colspan=12 style=| Exhibition

|-
!colspan=12 style=|Regular season

|-  
!colspan=12 style=|Big Ten tournament

|-
!colspan=9 style=|NCAA tournament

Source

Rankings

*AP does not release post-NCAA Tournament rankings^Coaches did not release a Week 1 poll.

Player statistics

References

Wisconsin Badgers men's basketball seasons
Wisconsin
Badgers men's basketball team
Badgers men's basketball team
Wisconsin